Jason Gwynne is a journalist, most widely known for his 2004 documentary on the British National Party (BNP). The documentary was based on undercover footage gathered by Gwynne who posed as a football hooligan looking to get involved in far-right politics.

External links
BBC News: Going undercover in the BNP

Year of birth missing (living people)
Place of birth missing (living people)
Living people
British male journalists
British National Party people